Artyom Igorevich Fidler (born 14 July 1983) is a Russian professional football official and a former player who played as a defensive midfielder. He works as an administrator for FC Ural Sverdlovsk Oblast.

Club career
He made his professional debut in the Russian First Division in 2005 for FC Ural Yekaterinburg.

Career statistics

Club

Notes

External links

1983 births
Sportspeople from Yekaterinburg
Living people
Russian footballers
Association football midfielders
FC Ural Yekaterinburg players
FC Kuban Krasnodar players
Russian Premier League players
Russian people of German descent